The White Cat Black Cat series was founded by Ma Sing-yuen and Fong She Mei in 2004. Nowadays, White Cat Black Cat books are well received by children and parents in Hong Kong.

Characters
The main characters are a white cat named Q Boy and a black cat scholar named Doctor A. They are characters created by Ma Sing-yuen (Ma-long).

Q Boy is the main character of the White Cat Black Cat series. He is one of the 24 classic local comic characters selected by CreateHK in 2012. The three-dimensional sculpture of Q Boy was displayed at Kowloon Park in Tsim Sha Tsui and Golden Bauhinia Square in Wan Chai.

Q Boy asks questions and Doctor A, who is the uncle of Q Boy, has answers. Their names refer to the English words "question" and "answer". Besides the characters mentioned above, Mr Ma Sing-yuen created several other interesting characters as well, like cat girl Miu Miu, Q Boy's little brother Chocolate, Q Boy's best friend Little D, etc. With their dialogue, children can learn efficiently and happily by reading the questions and answers. The series was established in 2004.

White Cat Black Cat Series
Funny Cat Detective Series
Fascinating Knowledge Series
History Adventure Series
Funny Liberal Studies Series
White Cat Black Cat View the World Series
Digital West Series
Six Box Comics Series

Recognition
The series has won several book awards in Hong Kong. Ma Sing-yuen and Fong She Mei won the Best Ten Books Election Award from Hong Kong Reading City several times, including 3rd Prize in 2011, 5th Prize in 2014, and 1st Prize in 2015.

Because of the popularity of White Cat Black Cat, Fong She-mei and Ma Sing-yuen had a Ming Pao interview in 2012.

In 2014, Sing Tao Daily invited Fong She-mei and Ma Sing-yuen to create a new section, Comics about 12 Traditional Chinese Model Essay.

Hong Kong Reading City

The Best Ten Books Election Award

 9th Edition of Hong Kong Reading City, in 2011: 3rd Prize, Six Box Comics Vol. 42
12th Edition of Hong Kong Reading City, in 2014: 5th Prize, Mystery of Dinosaurs
13th Edition of Hong Kong Reading City, in 2015: 1st Prize, Little Detective of Schoolyard II

The Best Ten Books Election is held by Hong Kong Reading City every year. The election is based on a trial reading system. Students can choose their favorite books and writers.

See also
 Black Cat, White Cat, a Serbian film

References

External links

 White Cat Black Cat
 "《白貓黑貓》十年展 重現逾四百書刊" (Archive). Sing Tao Daily at Yahoo! News. April 15, 2014.

Hong Kong comics titles
2004 establishments in Hong Kong
2004 comics debuts